Crowcombe Heathfield railway station is a station on the West Somerset Railway, a heritage railway in Somerset, England.

History
The railway was operated by the Bristol and Exeter Railway which became  a part of the Great Western Railway in 1876, but the West Somerset Railway remained an independent company until 1922 when it too was absorbed by the Great Western.

When the station first opened there was just one platform, on the east side of the line, on what is now the "up" side towards . A "down" loop line and second platform were opened in 1879, together with an accompanying signal box at its north eastern end. The developments also included an extension of the existing goods siding west of the station, accessed via the western throat, which was extended to the road overbridge. W.G.King's had a quarry at Triscombe, and had built their own  tramway transporting stone from the quarry to a stone-crusher, and then onwards to either: a tarmac/concrete plant located adjacent to the Station Master's House; or a tipper parallel to the goods siding, and hence loaded on to its own set of 5 plank  private owner wagons.

Nationalisation in 1948 saw it become a part of the Western Region of British Railways. British Rail closed the railway on 4 January 1971, during which they demolished a number of buildings on the stations platforms, and burnt down the original "squat" B&ER signal box.

WSR
The station reopened on 9 June 1979; the West Somerset Railway was now a heritage railway operating steam and diesel trains from Minehead to and Bishops Lydeard. The WSR removed the goods siding, and left the down side loop out of action. The station was still known as Crowcombe for a while, but the name was returned to Crowcombe Heathfield in 1991.

Description
The station has been designated by English Heritage as a grade II listed building. The railway workers' cottages and station master's house, together with the main station building, are the only original structures left. A display of permanent way can be found on the western platform and includes a portion of  broad gauge "baulk road" as was originally used on the line.

Loop and signal box

When the WSR reopened the line only the eastern "up" platform line was certified for operation. The station's loop was reinstated in May 1994 so a new signal box was required. A small standard-pattern GWR signal box was made using an upper wooden section reclaimed from the closed Ebbw Vale Sidings South in South Wales which was mounted on a newly constructed standard-height brick locking room. This has access steps on the southern side rather than the northern side as before. The 34 lever tappet-locking frame was first installed at Marsh Junction, Bristol, and then moved to Frome North in 1970. It was bought directly by the WSR after that signal box closed in 1984, and reinstalled in its current location, with 29 operating levers. The two loops were purposefully installed with linked-operated catch-points, which allows full two-train operations.

The signalling design allows the signal box to be switched-out of operation at quiet times when trains do not need to pass here.

Films made at Crowcombe
Several films and television programmes have been shot at Crowcombe:
 A Hard Day's Night (1964) featured The Beatles and was filmed in 1964 at London Marylebone station and on the Taunton to Minehead branch line.  A scene in which the band ran alongside a train was filmed near Crowcombe.
 The Flockton Flyer (1976-7) was a children's television drama series about a preserved railway that was filmed on the West Somerset Railway and included scenes filmed at many stations including Crowcombe Heathfield.
 The Land Girls (1997) was filmed on the West Somerset Railway and Crowcombe Heathfield featured as Bamford station.
 The Lion, the Witch and the Wardrobe (1988), a BBC television mini-series, where the four Pevensie children arrived at the start of the film after being evacuated by train from London.

Services

References

External links

 Crowcombe Heathfield Station on www.wsr.org.uk

West Somerset Railway
Heritage railway stations in Somerset
Grade II listed buildings in Taunton Deane
Railway stations in Great Britain opened in 1862
Railway stations in Great Britain closed in 1971
Railway stations in Great Britain opened in 1979
Grade II listed railway stations
1862 establishments in England
Former Great Western Railway stations